Argyroeides fuscipes is a moth of the subfamily Arctiinae. It was described by Rothschild in 1911. It is found in Brazil.

References

Moths described in 1911
Argyroeides
Moths of South America